Jeffrey M. Friedman (born July 20, 1954) is a molecular geneticist at New York City's Rockefeller University and an Investigator of the Howard Hughes Medical Institute. His discovery of the hormone leptin and its role in regulating body weight has had a major role in the area of human obesity.
Friedman is a physician scientist studying the genetic mechanisms that regulate body weight.  His research on various aspects of obesity received national attention in late 1994, when it was announced that he and his colleagues had isolated the mouse ob gene and its human homologue.  They subsequently found that injections of the encoded protein, leptin, decreases body weight of mice by reducing food intake and increasing energy expenditure.  Current research is aimed at understanding the genetic basis of obesity in human and the mechanisms by which leptin transmits its weight-reducing signal.

Education
Friedman was born in Orlando, Florida on July 20, 1954, and grew up in North Woodmere, New York, graduating from Hewlett High School in the Class of 1971.  As a young man he aspired to becoming a physician. He entered a six-year medical program out of high school and received his M.D. at the age of 22.  But after a year-long fellowship working in the laboratory of Mary Jane Kreek, he fell in love with the science life. "As a doctor, you're trained to absorb the facts you're given and accept them," says Friedman. "Science is almost the opposite.  It's a frontier of discovery that's always moving.  And I decided I wanted to do research."  Friedman started his affiliation with the Rockefeller University in 1980, where he was awarded a Ph.D. degree in 1986. Friedman received a BS from Rensselaer Polytechnic Institute in 1973 and M.D. degree from Albany Medical College in 1977 and completed a medical residency at Albany Medical College in 1980. From 1980 to 1981, he also served as a postgraduate fellow at Cornell University Medical College.

Career and research
Friedman was appointed Assistant Investigator with the Howard Hughes Medical Institute at The Rockefeller University in 1986, promoted to Associate Investigator in 1991, and Investigator in 1996 and received the Marilyn M. Simpson professorship in 1998.

When Friedman started his own laboratory at The Rockefeller University, he turned his attention to the question of weight regulation. Working with a special strain of mice, he set out to identify the hormone that normal animals use to control their appetite - a molecule that was missing in the plump rodents.  After eight years—on May 8, 1994, at 5:30 a.m.—he found what he was looking for: evidence that he'd located the gene that produces the hormone he later dubbed "leptin", after the Greek word for "thin" (λεπτός leptos).  "It was astonishingly beautiful", he says of the x-ray film that nailed the gene, a piece of data that now hangs on his office wall.

Numerous lines of evidence have suggested that energy balance in animals and humans is tightly controlled.  With the identification of leptin and its receptors by Friedman's laboratory, two of the molecular components of a system that maintains constant weight were identified.  Leptin is a hormone secreted by the adipose (fat) tissue in proportion to its mass that in turn modulates food intake relative to energy expenditure.  Increased fat mass increases leptin levels, which in turn reduces body weight; decreased fat mass leads to a decrease in leptin] levels and an increase in body weight.  By this mechanism, weight is maintained within a relatively narrow range.  Defects in the leptin gene are associated with severe obesity in animals and in humans.  Leptin acts on sets of neurons in brain centers that control energy balance.  Leptin also plays a general role in regulating many of the physiologic responses that are observed with changes in nutritional state, with clear effects on female reproduction, immune function and the function of many other hormones, including insulin.

Leptin feeds into the circuit of neurons in the brain that controls eating and energy expenditure.  When an animal loses weight, leptin concentrations fall.  This dip in leptin levels instructs the body to search for food.  In studies of obese mice, Friedman has found that leptin actually restructures the brain, rewiring the neural circuit that controls feeding. The hormone reinforces the nerve cells that encourage the body to slenderize and prunes the neurons that compel eating.

Friedman has published over one hundred and fifty publications and over ten book chapters.

He is also involved in the research  related to the 1st inbred rat model of obesity  and aging, also known as WNIN/Ob obese rats developed in National Institute of Nutrition, Hyderabad, India.

Awards and honors
Friedman's work in the area of obesity and the leptin gene has led to Friedman receiving many prestigious awards: 
 1994 and 1996 Time Magazines'''s Best of Science section
 1995 Popular Science's Best of Science Award
 1996 Heinrich Wieland Prize
 1997 Jacobaeus Prize
 1999 Steven C. Beering Award
 2000 Endocrinology Transatlantic Medal
 2000 Rolf Luft Award, Karolinska Hospital
 2001 Elected to the National Academy of Sciences
 2001 Bristol-Myers Squibb Award for Distinguished Achievement in Metabolic Research
 2005 Passano Award
 2005 Elected to The Royal Swedish Academy of Sciences, Foreign Member
 2005 Canada Gairdner International Award
 2007 Jessie Stevenson Kovalenko Medal
 2007 Danone International Prize
 2009 Keio Medical Science Prize
 2009 Shaw Prize for Life Sciences and Medicine
 2009 Hamdan Award for Medical Research Excellence
 2010 Thomson Reuters Citation Laureate
 2010 Robert J. and Claire Passano Foundation Award
 2010 Albert Lasker Basic Medical Research Award
 2012 The Foundation IPSEN 11th Endocrine Regulation Prize
 2012 UCL Prize Lecture in Clinical Science
 2012 BBVA Foundation Frontiers of Knowledge Award in Biomedicine (co-winner with Douglas Coleman)
 2013 King Faisal International Prize in Medicine
 2013 Elected to the American Academy of Arts and Sciences
 2019 Wolf Prize in Medicine
 2020 Breakthrough Prize in Life Sciences

His work on leptin also garnered him much television time, including an appearance on the PBS show Scientific American Frontiers'' in a long interview with host Alan Alda.

Personal life
Friedman lives in New York City with his wife, Lily Safani, and his twin daughters, Alexandra and Nathalie.

References

1954 births
Living people
Jewish American scientists
George W. Hewlett High School alumni
People from North Woodmere, New York
People from Orlando, Florida
Rensselaer Polytechnic Institute alumni
Members of the Royal Swedish Academy of Sciences
Albany Medical College alumni
American medical researchers
Members of the United States National Academy of Sciences
Foreign Members of the Royal Society
Recipients of the Albert Lasker Award for Basic Medical Research
Howard Hughes Medical Investigators
Rockefeller University faculty
Scientists from New York (state)
Rockefeller University alumni
Members of the National Academy of Medicine